Atopochilus christyi is a species of upside-down catfish endemic to the Democratic Republic of the Congo.  It occurs in the Ituri, Itimbri and Kasai Rivers as well as the Kinsuka Rapids and Boyoma Falls.  This species grows to a length of  SL.

Etymology
The catfish is named in honor of Cuthbert Christy (1863-1932),  a physician (specializing in sleeping sickness), a zoologist, an explorer, and the Director of the Congo Museum in Tervuren, Belgium, who collected the type specimen.

References

christyi
Freshwater fish of Africa
Fish of the Democratic Republic of the Congo
Endemic fauna of the Democratic Republic of the Congo
Taxa named by George Albert Boulenger
Fish described in 1920